Alexander Clark Park, Loganholme is a recreation park featuring native flora in Logan City, Queensland, Australia. Facilities include walking and cycling paths, wheelchair access, dog off-leash areas, picnic tables and barbecues, children playgrounds, fitness equipment, and riverside pontoons. The Loganholme park occupies an inner bend of the Logan River upstream from the Pacific Motorway crossing and Logan River Parklands.  Diverse and endangered tree species have been protected within the park.

History

Situated in what is now the suburb of Loganholme, the park once formed part of  applied for by Thomas Oldham around 1862, under the government regulations of 1861 to encourage cotton growing. After subdivision, and establishment of the Loganholme Plantation to grow sugar cane by the surveyor William Fryar, the land was eventually purchased by the pastoralist James Tyson in 1876.

A housing estate development in the 1970s, Marana Gardens, included an area for the park which was named Alexander Clark Memorial Park in 1976 after the pioneer and former councillor for the Albert Shire; the site having once formed part of his family's property.

In 1981, the North Albert Bowhunters Club moved to the site, establishing a competition range and camping area; by 1983 however, there were difficulties with the council planning a public recreational facility. During the 1980s and 1990s an Australian Football playing field was located in the park, home to local football club the Cobra's.

The park has a bushcare group which was granted funds in 2003 under the National Landcare Programme to remove weeds along the river aiming to prevent erosion, plant native trees and help in the recovery of the endangered Angle-stemmed myrtle tree species.

Native flora
Tree species which are native to the subtropical and warm temperate habitat of the Moreton Bay region can be seen in the park. Along with 200 year old blue gum trees (also known as forest red gums, Eucalyptus tereticornis), notable trees include:

 common names sourced from park labels
 trees with botanical signs in the park

Angle-stemmed myrtle

The park is one nine localities known for original populations of the endangered Gossia gonoclada (synonym Austromyrtus gonoclada) of the myrtle family, found only in the Moreton Bay region. Two  naturally occurring G. gonoclada trees are recorded in the park, with a further 31 having been planted as part of a recovery plan for the species.

References

Further reading

External links
Alexander Clark Park - Logan City Council

Logan City
Parks in Queensland
1976 establishments in Australia
Logan River